Acylita elongata is a species of moth of the family Noctuidae first described by William Schaus in 1906. It is found in Brazil. Its wingspan is about 34 mm.

Description
Head and thorax white suffused with brown; palpi pale yellow tinged with red at sides; pectus and legs ochreous tinged with brown; abdomen ochreous slightly irrorated (sprinkled) with brown. Forewing white suffused with pink especially on inner and terminal areas and slightly irrorated with brown; the costal edge white; the veins of terminal area slightly streaked with white; a faint brown fascia from base through the cell and thence obliquely to termen just below apex; a dark point in middle of cell; a terminal series of minute dark points. Hindwing white very faintly tinged with brown; the underside with the costa faintly tinged with pink and slightly irrorated with brown.

References

Hadeninae
Moths of South America
Moths described in 1906